Fquih Ben Salah or Fkih Ben Saleh is an Arab city city located in Morocco, in the region of Béni Mellal-Khénifra, created by the Arab Hilali tribes in the historical region of Tadla Central Morocco . According to the 2014 Moroccan census it has a population of 205,720, up from 128,446 in 2004. Its main economic activity is agriculture.

History 
The city is located on the territory of the Arab tribe Beni Amir, it became part of the Tadla tribal confederacy.

Twin towns
 Don Benito, Spain

See also
Ittihad Riadi Fkih Ben Salah

References

Populated places in Fquih Ben Salah Province
Municipalities of Morocco
Fquih Ben Salah